Arlington Christian School is a K4-12 private Christian school in Fairburn, Georgia, United States.

History
Arlington Christian School was founded in 1958; they bought  of land and a building by 1959. On September 14, 1959, the school opened with 140 students in grades one through nine and a staff of twelve.

Athletics at the time included soccer, basketball, and cheerleading. Since then the athletics department has grown to include softball, tennis, baseball, track and field, cross country, volleyball, and recently football. The school has also added music, drama, art, and foreign language.

With the school's rapid expansion, the need for more space became a problem, which was accommodated by a donation of land in south Fulton County. The present facilities were built, and in September 1976, the doors were opened at the new location. Two years later, a gymnasium was completed.

In 1986, the school merged with Greater Atlanta Christian Schools.

After seven years, families wanted a board and more local control of the school's operations. On July 1, 1994, the school was officially chartered as an independent entity. Since then, the school has been blessed with its highest enrollment since 1974, while maintaining high academic standards and Christian principles.

In August 2000, a high school hall was added, containing eight new classrooms, a computer and science lab, and a high school office.

In 2008, Arlington celebrated its 50th anniversary.

Academics 

Arlington Christian School is a college preparatory school that offers a variety of courses. It currently offers four AP classes: AP Calculus, AP Chemistry, AP History, and AP English. More AP classes, such as AP Biology and AP Government, were planned to be offered for the 2009–2010 school year.

Extracurricular activities

Athletics

 2008-2009: Men's Basketball Class AA State Champions
 2008-2009: Women's Basketball Class AA State Champions
 2009-2010: Softball Class AA State Champions
 2009-2010: Women's Basketball Class AA State Champions
 2010-2011: Women's Basketball Class AAA State Champions
2016-2017: Men's Basketball Class A State Champions 
2017-2018: Men's Basketball Class A State Champions
2021-2022 Men's Basketball Class AA State Champions

Fine arts
Arlington offers drama, band, chorus, art, and yearbook. The drama department competes in the one-act play competition every fall; in 2006, their performance of Shakespeare's A Midsummer Night's Dream took third place. The yearbook has been called one of the best of any Georgia high school.

References

External links
 Arlington Christian School
 Arlington Christian School on Private School Review

Christian schools in Georgia (U.S. state)
Educational institutions established in 1958
Private high schools in Georgia (U.S. state)
Schools in Fulton County, Georgia
Private middle schools in Georgia (U.S. state)
Private elementary schools in Georgia (U.S. state)
1958 establishments in Georgia (U.S. state)
Preparatory schools in Georgia (U.S. state)